Priscilla Hagan (born 8 April 1996) is a Ghanaian women's football forward who plays for Slovenian club Olimpija Ljubljana. She is a member of the Ghana women's national team.

Career

Club
In February 2019, Hagan moved to Turkey and joined Konak Belediyespor for the second half of the 2018–19 Turlish Women's First League season.

International
Hagan was called up to the Ghana women's national football team, however, could not play at the 2018 Africa Women Cup of Nations due to an injury she suffered at training during the national team's tour in Zambia and Kenya.

Hagan had another call-up to the team for the 2020 Turkish Women's Cup.

References

Living people
1996 births
Ghanaian women's footballers
Women's association football forwards
FCU Olimpia Cluj players
Konak Belediyespor players
ŽNK Mura players
ŽNK Olimpija Ljubljana players
Czech Women's First League players
Turkish Women's Football Super League players
Ghana women's international footballers
Ghanaian expatriate women's footballers
Ghanaian expatriate sportspeople in the Czech Republic
Expatriate women's footballers in the Czech Republic
Ghanaian expatriate sportspeople in Switzerland
Expatriate women's footballers in Switzerland
Ghanaian expatriate sportspeople in Romania
Expatriate women's footballers in Romania
Ghanaian expatriate sportspeople in Turkey
Expatriate women's footballers in Turkey
Ghanaian expatriate sportspeople in Poland
Expatriate women's footballers in Poland
Ghanaian expatriate sportspeople in Slovenia
Expatriate women's footballers in Slovenia